Loomis Street is a north–south street in Chicago that is 1400 W in Chicago's grid system, making it  west of the north–south baseline of State Street. It runs from the Chicago and Northwestern Railway tracks south, with interruptions, to Center Avenue in the suburb of Homewood. Between the railway tracks and the north branch of the Chicago River it is known as Noble Street and north of the River's north branch it is known as Southport Avenue. As Southport Avenue it goes up north to its intersection with Clark Street just south of Berteau. The street continues again at Argyle Street until Touhy Avenue as Glenwood Avenue.

Loomis Street is named for Horatio G. Loomis, one of the founders of the Chicago Board of Trade. Noble Street is named after civic leaders John and Mark Noble, who were employees of constable Archibald Clybourn.

Transit

Glenwood Avenue
The Morse station is located along Glenwood Avenue on the CTA Red Line.

Southport Avenue
Southport Avenue has a stop on the CTA Brown Line.

Noble Street

A horse car line opened on Noble Street between Milwaukee and Blackhawk Avenues on June 11, 1885; this was part of a route from Milwaukee to Wood Street and Cortland Avenue. Streetcars replaced horse cars in 1896, and the route was cut back to its southern half, to North and Ashland Avenues. As of 1928, this route did not have owl service, the last northbound car leaving at 8:40 p.m. One-man streetcars began service on November 1, 1921, and the line was restricted to rush hours only on July 25, 1931. Service ended on March 5, 1932, but service cars going to the Elston carbarn continued using it until February 8, 1944.

Loomis Street
What is now CTA's Green Line formerly had two stations on Loomis Street; one on the Lake Street Elevated, and the other on the Englewood Branch. The Lake Street Elevated station operated from 1893 to 1948, while the one on the Englewood Branch operated from 1907 until it was replaced by the Ashland/63rd station in 1969.

References

Works cited

Streets in Chicago